Daniel H. Rosen (born 1967) is an American business executive, academic and author. He is an expert on the Chinese economy, and writes and publishes on the topic of China's marketplace. A contributor to public debate, he has advised key policy-shaping government bodies.

Rosen is a partner at Rhodium Group, LLC, a New York-based advisory firm which he founded in 2003. He is also a visiting fellow at the Peterson Institute for International Economics, a nonpartisan think tank based in Washington, D.C. In addition, he is an adjunct professor at Columbia University, where he has taught a graduate seminar on the Chinese marketplace at the School of International and Public Affairs since 2001. Rosen is also a Member of the Council on Foreign Relations and Board Member of the National Committee on United States-China Relations.

Prior to his work with Rhodium Group, he was Senior Advisor for International Economic Policy at the United States National Economic Council and National Security Council from 2000–2001, where he worked on China's accession to the World Trade Organization.

He is the author or co-author of 7 books, mainly relating to China and its economy. The latest, a major study on Chinese foreign direct investment in the United States, was published in 2011 by the Asia Society. An American Open Door?: Maximing the Benefits of Chinese Direct Investment garnered much attention as the most comprehensive study to date of mergers, acquisitions, and greenfield investments by Chinese firms in the United States.

Publications
 An American Open Door?: Maximizing the Benefits of Chinese Investment in the US (2011, Asia Society)
 The Implications of China-Taiwan Economic Liberalization (2010, Peterson Institute)
 Prospects for a US-Taiwan Free Trade Agreement (2004, Peterson Institute)
 Roots of Competitiveness: China's Evolving Agriculture Interests (with Scott Rozelle and Jikun Huang, 2004, Peterson Institute)
 The New Economy and APEC (with Catherine L. Mann, 2002, Peterson Institute)
 Behind the Open Door: Foreign Enterprises in the Chinese Marketplace (1998, Peterson Institute and The Council on Foreign Relations)
 Powering China (with Dan Esty, 1995, The Rockefeller Brothers Foundation)

References

External links
 

American business executives
Living people
1967 births